Tsancho Atanasov (born 1 December 1954) is a Bulgarian judoka. He competed at the 1976 Summer Olympics and the 1980 Summer Olympics.

References

External links
 

1954 births
Living people
Bulgarian male judoka
Olympic judoka of Bulgaria
Judoka at the 1976 Summer Olympics
Judoka at the 1980 Summer Olympics
Place of birth missing (living people)